Yingjie Jay Guo (born 1958) is a communications engineer in Australia, specialising in antennas, wireless and broadband communications research. He is an adjunct professor at the University of New South Wales, and at Macquarie University in Sydney, and director of the Wireless Technologies Laboratory at the Commonwealth Scientific and Industrial Research Organisation. He is a recipient of Australia Engineering Innovation Award (2012), Australia Engineering Excellence Award (2007), and CSIRO Chairman's Medal (2007 and 2012). He has a BSc (1982) and master's degree (1984) from Xidian University, and a PhD (1987) from Xian Jiaotong University.

Books
2002 - Fresnel Zone Antennas, with Stephen K. Barton
2004 - Advances in Mobile Radio Access Networks 
2009 - Ground-Based Radio Positioning, with Kegen Yu and Ian Sharp

References

External links

Professor Y. Jay Guo: Laboratory Director and Theme Leader

1958 births
Living people
Engineering educators
Xi'an Jiaotong University alumni
Xidian University alumni
Academic staff of the University of New South Wales
Academic staff of Macquarie University
Fellows of the Australian Academy of Technological Sciences and Engineering